Microcystic lymphatic malformations are a cutaneous condition characterized by aggregations of ill-defined, abnormal, microscopic lymphatic channels.

See also 
 Cystic lymphatic malformation
 List of cutaneous conditions

References 

Cutaneous congenital anomalies